This Child is the second album by Susan Aglukark, released in 1995. The album was Susan's commercial breakthrough in Canada, spawning chart hits with "O Siem" and "Hina Na Ho (Celebration)", and making Susan the first Inuk performer ever to have a Top 40 hit.

This album was also released in Japan on September 6, 1995 with the catalog number of TOCP-8650.

Track listing
 "Hina Na Ho (Celebration)" (Aglukark, Irschick, John Landry) - 4:11
 "Shamaya" (Aglukark) - 4:34
 "Suffer in Silence" (Kirkpatrick, Sprague) - 3:58
 "O Siem" (Aglukark, Irschick) - 4:27
 "Dreams for You" (Aglukark) - 3:57
 "This Child" (Susan Aglukark, Chad Irschick) - 6:26
 "Kathy I" (Aglukark, Kelita Haverland) - 4:31
 "Pond Inlet" (Aglukark, Irschick) - 3:57
 "Slippin' Through the Cracks" (Bill Candy) - 3:21
 "Breakin' Down" (Aglukark, Candy, Haverland, Irschick) - 3:47
 "Casualties of War" (Aglukark, Irschick) - 5:41

Chart performance

References

1995 albums
Susan Aglukark albums
EMI Records albums